The following list contains results of the 2022 Hungarian parliamentary election by constituency.

Bács-Kiskun County

District 1

District 2

District 3

District 4

District 5

District 6

Baranya County

District 1

District 2

District 3

District 4

Békés County

District 1

District 2

District 3

District 4

Borsod-Abaúj-Zemplén County

District 1

District 2

District 3

District 4

District 5

District 6

District 7

Budapest

District 1

District 2

District 3

District 4

District 5

District 6

District 7

District 8

District 9

District 10

District 11

District 12

District 13

District 14

District 15

District 16

District 17

District 18

Csongrád-Csanád County

District 1

District 2

District 3

District 4

Fejér County

District 1

District 2

District 3

District 4

District 5

Győr-Moson-Sopron County

District 1

District 2

District 3

District 4

District 5

Hajdú-Bihar County

District 1

District 2

District 3

District 4

District 5

District 6

Heves County

District 1

District 2

District 3

Jász-Nagykun-Szolnok County

District 1

District 2

District 3

District 4

Komárom-Esztergom County

District 1

District 2

District 3

Nógrád County

District 1

District 2

Pest County

District 1

District 2

District 3

District 4

District 5

District 6

District 7

District 8

District 9

District 10

District 11

District 12

Somogy County

District 1

District 2

District 3

District 4

Szabolcs-Szatmár-Bereg County

District 1

District 2

District 3

District 4

District 5

District 6

Tolna County

District 1

District 2

District 3

Vas County

District 1

District 2

District 3

Veszprém County

District 1

District 2

District 3

District 4

Zala County

District 1

District 2

District 3

Sources 
https://vtr.valasztas.hu/ogy2022/egyeni-valasztokeruletek?tab=county

Elections in Hungary